Said the Whale is a Juno Award-winning Vancouver based indie rock band started by Ben Worcester and Tyler Bancroft in 2007.

History

Their debut EP Taking Abalonia was released in 2007. It was re-released with seven new songs on June 3, 2008, in Canada as a full-length LP under the name Howe Sounds/Taking Abalonia.

On July 1, 2009, Said the Whale released the EP The Magician to drum up anticipation for the release of their second full-length album Islands Disappear on October 13, 2009.

On November 18, 2010, the band placed second behind rapper Kyprios in CKPK-FM's 2010 Peak Performance Project, winning $75,000.

In the spring of 2011, Said the Whale toured the U.S. for the first time. During this time they were the subject of the CBC documentary Winning America directed by Brent Hodge and Thomas Buchan. The movie documented the band's trip and performances along the West Coast of North America on their way to and from Austin, Texas's SXSW Music Festival and culminated when Said the Whale won the Juno Award for New Group of the Year at the 2011 Juno Awards. The documentary aired on July 23, 2011, in British Columbia, and on April 7, 2012, across Canada.

They released their EP New Brighton on November 8, 2011, in preparation for their third full-length album, Little Mountain, released internationally on March 6, 2012.

In early 2012, the band was awarded a spot on the Canadian music magazine Rockstar Weekly'''s list of the "Top 12 RockStars to Watch in 2012". The list also included Van Halen, The Rolling Stones, and Rush. The band performed at the Sasquatch! Music Festival in 2012 and 2013.

Said the Whale released their fourth studio album, titled hawaiii, on September 17, 2013.

On January 4, 2017, they announced their fifth album, As Long As Your Eyes Are Wide. At the same time, they announced the departure of Spencer Schoening, and will be performing as a trio from now on.  The album was released March 31, 2017.  The first single is "Step Into The Darkness."

On March 5, 2017, they posted an Instagram video with an email address which fans could contact in order to listen to the whole album for free before its release. Fans could stream the whole album on a personalized, private SoundCloud account from the 10th until the 15th of March without leaking or sharing the link. From the 15th until the 26th of March, the fans could invite their friends to listen to the album in a "listening party" in order to promote it but still not sharing the link to the album, keeping it strictly limited to those who were sent the link.

Said the Whale finished a Canada-wide tour from in the spring 2017.

In September 2018, Said the Whale signed to Canadian indie label Arts & Crafts, and announced a new record to be released in early 2019. The band released a new single "UnAmerican" on October 12, 2018. They released their sixth studio album, Cascadia, on February 8, 2019.

Throughout 2021, Said the Whale released a number of singles and music videos from their upcoming album, including "Honey Lungs," "Everything She Touches is Gold to Me," "Show Me Everything," and "99 to the Moon." In May, Bancroft announced he was launching a new record label called EVERYTHING FOREVER. Said the Whale's seventh studio album, Dandelion, was released on October 22, 2021, via that label.

Awards
 2010: Peak Performance Project 2nd Place – $75,000
Juno Awards:
 2011: Juno Award for New Group of the Year – Said the Whale

Members

Current

Ben Worcester – guitar, vocals (2007–present)
Tyler Bancroft – guitar, vocals (2007–present)
Jaycelyn Brown – keyboards (2008–present)
Bradley Connor – drums (touring) (2017–present)
Spencer Schoening -drums (hometown) (2022-present)
Lincoln Hotchen – bass (2018–present)

Former
Spencer Schoening – drums (2007–2017)
Laura Smith – keyboards (2007)
Jeff LaForge – bass (2007–2008)
Colin Dodds – keyboards (2008)
Peter Carruthers – bass (2009–2011)
Nathan Shaw – bass (2011–2016)

Discography
 Studio albums 
 Howe Sounds/Taking Abalonia (June 3, 2008)
 Islands Disappear (October 13, 2009)
 Little Mountain (March 6, 2012) No. 17 CAN
 hawaiii (September 17, 2013) No. 18 CAN
 As Long As Your Eyes Are Wide (March 31, 2017) No. 55 CAN
 Cascadia (February 8, 2019) No. 47 CANDandelion (October 22, 2021)

Extended playsLet's Have Sound (March, 2007)Taking Abalonia (May, 2007)West Coast Christmas (December, 2007)West Coast Christmas 2008 (December, 2008)The Magician (July, 2009)West Coast Christmas 2009 (December, 2009)Bear Bones (February, 2010)Xmas EP (December, 2010)New Brighton (November, 2011)I Love You'' (June 6, 2013)

Singles

References

External links
Said the Whale official website

Canadian indie rock groups
Musical groups from Vancouver
Musical groups established in 2007
Canadian power pop groups
2007 establishments in British Columbia
Juno Award for Breakthrough Group of the Year winners